The Men's two-man bobsleigh competition at the 2002 Winter Olympics in Salt Lake City, United States was held on 16 and 17 February, at Park City.

Results

Each of the 37 two-man teams entered for the event completed all four runs

References

Bobsleigh at the 2002 Winter Olympics
Men's bobsleigh at the 2002 Winter Olympics
Men's events at the 2002 Winter Olympics